Toacris is a genus of grasshoppers in the family Acrididae, subfamily Catantopinae and tribe Tauchirini.  Species have been recorded in southern China and Vietnam, but may also be present elsewhere in Indo-China.

Species
The Orthoptera Species File and Catalogue of Life list:
Toacris gorochovi Storozhenko, 1992
Toacris nanlingensis Liu & Yin, 1988
Toacris shaloshanensis Tinkham, 1940
Toacris yaoshanensis Tinkham, 1940 - type species

References

Catantopinae
Acrididae genera
Orthoptera of Indo-China